Al-Samiriyya, was a Palestinian Arab village in the District of Baysan. It was depopulated by the Israel Defense Forces during the 1948 Arab-Israeli War on May 27, 1948, as part of Operation Gideon. It was located 7 km southeast of Baysan.

History
The village had a mosque and three Khirbas: Khirbat al-Humra, Tulul al-Thawm, and Tall al-Khab.

Ottoman era
In 1882, the PEF's Survey of Western Palestine found at Khurbet es Samriyeh:  "Ruined walls and traces of ruins alone remain. The place has, however, the appearance of an ancient site, and is well supplied with water."  Of Khurbet el Humra they noted:  "A few walls standing and a ruined mill. No indications of antiquity exist", while  of Tellûl eth Thŭm they noted:  "Artificial mounds; a stream of water to the north."

British Mandate era
In  the 1922 census of Palestine, conducted by the  Mandatory Palestine authorities,  Samriyeh had a population of 162; all  Muslims, increasing in the  1931 census   to 181 Muslims, in a total of 41 houses.

In the 1945 statistics the village had a population of 250; 240 Muslims and 10 Christians, with a total of 3,873  dunums of land. Of this, 11 dunums  were irrigated or used for plantation, 2,801 were for cereals, while 22 dunams were built-up land.

1948, aftermath
The village became depopulated in May, 1948, after the Arab inhabitants of  Baysan had been expelled.

In 1951 Sdei Trumot was established on village land, just north of the village site.

In 1992 the village site was described: "Only collapsed roofs remain, they are located on the western edge of the  Sdei Trumot settlement."

References

Bibliography

 
 

 
  
israel

External links
Welcome To al-Samiriyya
 al-Samiriyya,  Zochrot
Survey of Western Palestine, map 9:   IAA, Wikimedia commons

Arab villages depopulated during the 1948 Arab–Israeli War